An ancillary weapon (also known as a secondary weapon, auxiliary weapon, or backup weapon) is a weapon used to supplement a primary or main weapon in the event it cannot be used or is ineffective in a certain application or situation. Examples of ancillary weapons to main weapons include a melee weapon to a ranged weapon, a sidearm to a service weapon, or a light gun to a heavy cannon.

Overview
Ancillary weapons are intended to supplement a main weapon, and may be used either when the main weapon becomes inoperable temporarily (e.g. depleting ammunition) or completely (e.g. being destroyed), or when the main weapon is unsuitable for the current situation (e.g. a long gun in close-quarters combat). Ancillary weapons typically have lower firepower or effective ranges than the main weapon, due to them being intended for emergencies or when necessary and not for regular service. They may be weapons that were historically considered main weapons but are no longer effective in those roles, such as swords when firearms became the primary infantry weapon in warfare.

Ancillary weapons do not have to be actual weapons and may technically include improvised weaponry, especially when no other ancillary weapons are issued or effective. For example, during World War I, utility knives and entrenching shovels were used as ancillary weapons during hand-to-hand combat in trenches, where rifles and fixed bayonets were too long to be used effectively. By 1915, soldiers on both sides routinely sharpened the edges of entrenching shovels for use as weapons.

Examples 

A simple example of an ancillary weapon is a bayonet, a bladed weapon mounted to the front of a firearm. Bayonets were widely issued when service weapons were long guns that were impractical for close combat, such as muskets and bolt action rifles, and they were often the only ancillary weapon available for soldiers that were not issued sidearms, such as riflemen. Most bayonets can also be used on their own as a combat knife.

"Underbarrel" or "underslung" weapons—those installed on the lower barrel shroud or rail integration system, such as underbarrel grenade launchers or shotguns—are examples of ancillary weapons used in conjunction with a main weapon rather than as a backup weapon: underbarrel grenade launchers are used to provide explosive weapon support where a conventional hand grenade would not reach its target or take too long to use, while underbarrel shotguns are used in door breaching or close-quarters combat.

Traditionally, military officers carry a sidearm. This was historically some form of sword or dagger until the 19th century, when such melee weapons became ineffective and were replaced by a revolver or pistol. Since World War II, when weapons with low rates of fire became increasingly ineffective in combat, most military officers are issued a semi-automatic pistol as a sidearm.

Many military combat vehicles and aircraft are often equipped with ancillary weapons.  Tanks are armed with a large-caliber tank gun as their main weapon, but most tanks also have a coaxial or top-mounted machine gun turret to be used against infantry or unarmored vehicles where using a tank round would be considered excessive or wasteful. Fighter aircraft carry armaments such as missiles, rocket pods, and aerial bombs as their main weapons, and most fighters also have an autocannon or high-caliber machine gun as an ancillary weapon for dogfights or strafing. Bombers carry hundreds of aerial bombs as their main weapons, but older bombers also had tail gunner turrets to defend against enemy aircraft. Naval vessels with certain main weapons may also have certain ancillary weapons to be used against specific targets; for example, a vessel with naval guns as main weapons may also have torpedoes and depth charges for use against submarines, or vertical launching systems for launching missiles against aerial or land targets.

Some law enforcement officers and security guards that are already armed with a main weapon (often a handgun) may carry a smaller backup handgun, often in a lower caliber or with less ammunition capacity than their main handgun, in the rare event their main handgun is unavailable (e.g. stolen by a suspect). They may also use their issued main handgun as an ancillary weapon if they are authorized to use a long arm, such as a rifle or shotgun. Additionally, many police officers carry less-lethal ancillary weapons such as a Taser, pepper spray, or batons.

References

Weapons
Personal weapons